Mary Anne Virginia Gabriel (7 February 1825 – 7 August 1877) was an English singer and composer. She was also known as Mrs. George E. March.

Life
Virginia Gabriel was born in Banstead, Surrey, England, the daughter of Major-general "Archangel" Gabriel. She studied piano with Johann Peter Pixis, Theodor Dohler, Sigismond Thalberg and Bernhard Molique and composition with opera composer Saverio Mercadante.

In 1870 Gabriel went for an extended stay at Glamis Castle in the Scottish Lowlands, and was reportedly responsible, among others, for later accounts of the castle's "secret" having to do with a mysterious occupant, the Monster of Glamis.

Gabriel wrote popular ballads which established her reputation as a songwriter and composer. Although women songwriters were well accepted in the 19th century and she had no problems in getting her songs published, she struggled to get publishers for her more serious compositions. For example, she had to pay for self-publication of her cantata Dreamland. Although her songwriting style was Romantic, her songs always reflected ability and inventiveness because of her strength as a serious composer.

Gabriel married her librettist George March in 1874, who was employed by the Foreign Office. The Times reported that she died in 1877 from "injuries sustained by a fall from a carriage". Her Evening Post obituary described her as being "much liked in Society" and as possessing "...a kindness of heart."

Works
Gabriel was known for cantatas and operas and she also wrote songs. Selected works include:
Evangeline (1873) cantata
Graziella (1870) cantata
Dreamland (1870) cantata
Widows Bewitched (1865) opera 
A Quiet Chateau (1867) opera
Who's The Heir? (1868) opera
Lost and Found (1870) opera
Grass Widows, opera
The Shepherd of Cournouailles, opera 
The Follies of a Night, opera
A Rainy Day, opera 
The Lion's Mouth, opera bouffe
Change upon change (Text: Elizabeth Barrett Browning) 
Du bist wie eine Blume, op. 1, no. 3 (Text: Heinrich Heine) 
Oh, wilt thou have my hand, Dear (Text: Elizabeth Barrett Browning) 
Orpheus With His Lute (Text: John Fletcher)
At the Window (Text: Robert Browning) song
A Mother's Song, song
Don't Forget Me Quite (Text: Mrs Francis Anne Kemble) song
Ruby, song
Beryl (Companion Song to Ruby)
Brighter Hours, song
Asleep, song
Pearl, song
Emerald, song
The Opal Ring, song
When Sparrows Build (Text: Jean Ingelow) song
List'ning Mother, song
The Door Ajar, song
A Song to Lay at the Feet of my Love
Little Golden Hair, song
Corra Linn, song
O Spare my Boy at Sea, song
Slumber, Mine Own, song
At my Feet, song
Light through Darkness (from the cantata: Dreamland) song
Dreams of Those who loved me (from the cantata: Dreamland) song
Chloe sat beside the River (from the opera: Widows Bewitched) song
Love is gone a Maying (from the opera: Widows Bewitched) song
Sweet Seventeen, song
The Golden Wedding Day, song
Under the Trellised Vine (from the cantata: Graziella) song
Farewell my Bark (from the cantata: Graziella) song
You came to me with winning smile, song
The Fisherman's Widow, contralto song
I will arise, sacred song
What will you do? sacred song
The Lord is my portion church anthem
Lily Graeme, song
A Dead Past, song
The Choice, song
Thoughts! song
Spirit Love, song
Twilight, song
Three Lilies, song
Friends, song

References

1825 births
1877 deaths
19th-century classical composers
British women classical composers
English classical composers
English opera composers
Road incident deaths in England
People from Banstead
Musicians from Surrey
19th-century English musicians
Women opera composers
19th-century British composers
19th-century women composers